A special election was held in  on January 21, 1826 to fill a vacancy caused by the resignation of John Randolph (J) on December 26, 1825, after being elected to the Senate.

Election results

Crump took his seat on February 6, 1826

See also
List of special elections to the United States House of Representatives

References

Virginia 1826 05
Virginia 1826 05
1826 05
Virginia 05
United States House of Representatives 05
United States House of Representatives 1826 05
January 1826 events